Paul O'Shaughnessy may refer to: 

Paul O'Shaughnessy (musician) (born 1961), Irish fiddler
Paul O'Shaughnessy (footballer) (born 1981), English footballer